Thomas Vincent Fleming (November 20, 1873 – December 26, 1957) nicknamed "Sleuth", was a professional baseball player. He played parts of three seasons in Major League Baseball, primarily as an outfielder. His minor league baseball career spanned seventeen seasons, from 1894 until 1910.

External links

Major League Baseball outfielders
New York Giants (NL) players
Pottsville Colts players
Easton Dutchmen players
Altoona Mad Turtles players
Rockford Forest City players
Rockford Reds players
Sunbury Pirates players
Petersburg Farmers players
Hampton Clamdiggers players
Roanoke Magicians players
New Castle Quakers players
Indianapolis Hoosiers (minor league) players
Omaha Omahogs players
St. Joseph Saints players
Newport Colts players
Providence Clamdiggers (baseball) players
Philadelphia Athletics (minor league) players
Harrisburg Ponies players
Hartford Indians players
Wooden Nutmegs players
Colorado Springs Millionaires players
Omaha Indians players
Sioux City Soos players
Portland Giants players
Holyoke Paperweights players
Jacksonville Jays players
Youngstown Ohio Works players
Olean Candidates players
East Liverpool (minor league baseball) players
Wheeling Stogies players
Lowell Tigers players
Haverhill Hustlers players
19th-century baseball players
Baseball players from Pennsylvania
Minor league baseball managers
1873 births
1957 deaths